Skyward may refer to:

Skyward, an American software company for school management and municipality management technologies
Skyward (film), a 1980 American film directed by Ron Howard
Skyward (novel), a 2018 American young adult science fiction novel by Brandon Sanderson
Skyward Express, a private airline operating in Kenya
Joe Skyward, American bass player
Skyward, a 2017 streaming film directed by Jonathan Judge